Mindaugas Kupšas (born 9 April 1991) is a Lithuanian professional basketball player for Kaohsiung Aquas of the T1 League.

Professional career
Kupšas played for Lietkabelis in the 2012–13 season and averaged 10.5 points, 5.5 rebounds and 0.8 blocks per 21 minutes of game action. He went undrafted at the 2013 NBA draft.

On August 6, 2014, Kupšas was loaned to the Estonian team BC Kalev/Cramo for the 2014–15 season.

On August 14, 2016, Kupšas signed with Vytautas Prienai–Birštonas. On February 7, 2017, he parted ways with Vytautas to join CB Clavijo of the Spanish LEB Oro.

On August 10, 2017, Kupšas signed a one-year deal with BC Juventus.

On August 7, 2018, Kupšas returned to Lietkabelis Panevėžys for a second stint, signing for the 2018–19 season. In 56 games played with Lietkabelis, he averaged 8.9 points and 4.7 rebounds, while shooting 62 percent from the field.

On August 14, 2019, Kupšas signed a one-year deal with Hapoel Jerusalem of the Israeli Premier League.

On March 2, 2020, Kupšas parted ways with Hapoel Jerusalem to join Filou Oostende of the Belgian Pro Basketball League.

On October 1, 2021, Kupšas signed with Kaohsiung Aquas of the T1 League. On June 30, 2022, Kupšas was selected to the all-defensive first team of the T1 League in 2021–22 season. On July 20, Kupšas re-signed with the Kaohsiung Aquas.

References

External links
 RealGM profile
 NBADraft.net profile

1991 births
Living people
BC Juventus players
BC Kalev/Cramo players
BC Lietkabelis players
BC Nevėžis players
BC Prienai players
BC Žalgiris players
BC Žalgiris-2 players
BC Zepter Vienna players
Centers (basketball)
Hapoel Jerusalem B.C. players
Lithuanian expatriate basketball people in Spain
Lithuanian men's basketball players
LSU-Atletas basketball players
Universiade bronze medalists for Lithuania
Universiade medalists in basketball
Lithuanian expatriate basketball people in Estonia
Medalists at the 2011 Summer Universiade
Expatriate basketball people in Taiwan
Kaohsiung Aquas players
T1 League imports
T1 League All-Stars